In judicial practice, back-to-back life sentences are two or more consecutive life sentences given to a felon. This penalty is typically used to minimize the chance of the felon being released from prison.

This is a common punishment for a defendant convicted of multiple murder in the United States. Depending on the jurisdiction in which the case is tried, a defendant receiving a life sentence may become eligible for parole after serving a minimum length of time, on the order of 1525 years. If a back-to-back penalty is imposed, the defendant must serve that minimum for every life sentence before parole can be granted. Such a penalty also ensures that even if some of the murder convictions are overturned on appeal, the defendant must still serve the sentences for the ones left standing.

Other countries either allow multiple concurrent life sentences which can be served at the same time (e.g. Russia), or allow multiple consecutive life sentences with a single minimum term (e.g. Australia), thus allowing earlier release of the prisoner.

In Canada, since 2 December 2011 it has been possible for multiple maximum terms of parole ineligibility to be imposed for multiple first-degree murders. The mandatory penalty for first-degree murder being life imprisonment with 25 years' ineligibility for parole, the court may stack multiple 25-year terms to account for multiple victims.  Before doing this, the judge must consider a jury recommendation to this effect. The longest minimum sentence so far is 75 years, handed out to four offenders: Justin Bourque (later reduced to 25 years), John Paul Ostamas, Douglas Garland and Derek Saretzky. The provision permitting this was ruled unconstitutional by the Quebec Superior Court and Quebec Court of Appeal in the case of Alexandre Bissonnette; and the Supreme Court of Canada dismissed the Crown's appeal in May 2022, finding consecutive life sentences to be unconstitutional.

See also 
 Incapacitation (penology)
 Life imprisonment

References

Sentencing (law)